Gudea (Sumerian: , Gu3-de2-a) was a ruler (ensi) of the state of Lagash in Southern Mesopotamia, who ruled circa 2080–2060 BC (short chronology) or 2144-2124 BC (middle chronology). He probably did not come from the city, but had married Ninalla, daughter of the ruler Ur-Baba (2164–2144 BC) of Lagash, thus gaining entrance to the royal house of Lagash. He was succeeded by his son Ur-Ningirsu. Gudea ruled at a time when the center of Sumer was ruled by the Gutian dynasty, and when Ishtup-Ilum ruled to the north in Mari. Under Gudea, Lagash had a golden age, and seemed to enjoy a high level of independence from the Gutians.

Inscriptions

Gudea chose the title of énsi (town-king or governor), not the more exalted lugal (Akkadian šarrum). Gudea did not style himself "god of Lagash" as he was not deified during his own lifetime, this title must have been given to him posthumously as in accordance with Mesopotamian traditions for all rulers except Naram-Sin of Akkad and some of the Ur III kings.

The 20 years of his reign are all known by name; the main military exploit seems to have occurred in his Year 6, called the "Year when Anshan was smitten with weapons".

Although Gudea claimed to have conquered Elam and Anshan, most of his inscriptions emphasize the building of irrigation channels and temples, and the creation of precious gifts to the gods.

Inscriptions mention temples built by Gudea in Ur, Nippur, Adab, Uruk and Bad-Tibira. This indicates the growing influence of Gudea in Sumer. His predecessor, Urbaba, had already made his daughter Enanepada high priestess of Nanna at Ur, which indicates a great deal of political power as well.

Materials for his buildings and statues were brought from all parts of western Asia: cedar wood from the Amanus mountains, quarried stones from Lebanon, copper from northern Arabia, gold and precious stones from the desert between Canaan and Egypt, diorite from Magan (Oman), and timber from Dilmun (Bahrain).

Statues of Gudea

Twenty-six statues of Gudea have been found so far during excavations of Telloh (ancient Girsu) with most of the rest coming from the art trade. The early statues were made of limestone, steatite and alabaster; later, when wide-ranging trade-connections had been established, the more costly exotic diorite was used. Diorite had already been used by old Sumerian rulers (Statue of Entemena). These statues include inscriptions describing trade, rulership and religion. These were one of many types of Neo-Sumerian art forms.

Religion

The pleas to the gods under Gudea and his successors appear more creative and honest: whereas the Akkadian kings followed a rote pattern of cursing the progeny and tearing out the foundations of those that vandalize a stele, the Lagašite kings send various messages. Times were violent after the Akkadian empire lost power over southern Mesopotamia, and the god receiving the most attention from Gudea was Ningirsu—a god of battle. Though there is only one mention of martial success on the part of Gudea, the many trappings of war which he builds for Ningirsu indicate a violent era. Southern Mesopotamian cities defined themselves through their worship, and the decision on Gudea's part for Lagaš to fashion regalia of war for its gods is indicative of the temperament of the times.

Though obviously the foundation and progeny curse was not the only religious invocation by the political powers during the Akkadian empire, it demonstrates a certain standardization, and with it, stagnation, of the position of the gods that likely did not sit well with the people of Lagaš. Ur-Ningirsu I, with whom the Gudean dynasty of Lagaš begins, leaves little in the way of inscriptions, and though some mention of various gods seems to indicate a more central role, it is not until Gudea that there can be a side-by-side comparison with the old curse of Sargon of Akkad. The inscription on a statue of Gudea as architect of the House of Ningirsu, warns the reader of doom if the words are altered, but there is a startling difference between the warnings of Sargon or his line and the warnings of Gudea. The one is length; Gudea's curse lasts nearly a quarter of the inscription's considerable length, and another is creativity. The gods will not merely reduce the offender's progeny to ash and destroy his foundations, no, they will, "let him sit down in the dust instead of on the seat they set up for him". He will be "slaughtered like a bull… seized like an aurochs by his fierce horn".

But these differences, though demonstrating a Lagašite respect of religious figures simply in the amount of time and energy they required, are not as telling as the language Gudea uses to justify any punishment. Whereas Sargon or Naram-Sin simply demand punishment to any who change their words, based on their power, Gudea defends his words through tradition, “since the earliest days, since the seed sprouted forth, no one was (ever) supposed to alter the utterance of a ruler of Lagaš who, after building the Eninnu for my lord Ningirsu, made things function as they should”. Changing the words of Naram-Sin, the living god, is treason, because he is the king. But changing the words of Gudea, simple governor of Lagaš, is unjust, because he made things work right.

Reforms
The social reforms instituted during Gudea's rulership, which included the cancellation of debts and allowing women to own family land, may have been honest reform or a return to old Lagašite custom.

His era was especially one of artistic development. But it was Ningirsu who received the majority of Gudea's attention. Ningirsu the war god, for whom Gudea built maces, spears, and axes, all appropriately named for the destructive power of Ningirsu—enormous and gilt. However, the devotion for Ningirsu was especially inspired by the fact that this was Gudea's personal god and that Ningirsu was since ancient times the main god of the Lagashite region (together with his spouse Ba'u or Baba).

In matters of trade, Lagash under Gudea had extensive commercial communications with distant realms. According to his own records, Gudea brought cedars from the Amanus and Lebanon mountains in Syria, diorite from eastern Arabia, copper and gold from central and southern Arabia and from Sinai, while his armies were engaged in battles in Elam on the east.

The Gudea cylinders, written after the life of Gudea, paints an attractive picture of southern Mesopotamia during the Lagaš supremacy. In it, “The Elamites came to him from Elam… loaded with wood on their shoulders… in order to build Ningirsu’s House” (p. 78), the general tone being one of brotherly love in an area that has known only regional conflict.

Gudea built more than the House of Ningirsu, he restored tradition to Lagaš. His use of the title ensi, when he obviously held enough political influence, both in Lagaš and in the region, to justify lugal, demonstrates the same political tact as his emphasis on the power of the divine.

Ur-Ningirsu II, the next ruler of Lagaš, took as his title, "Ur-Ningirsu, ruler of Lagaš, son of Gudea, ruler of Lagaš, who had built Ningirsu’s house" (p. 183).

International relations

In an inscription, Gudea referred to the Meluhhans who came to Sumer to sell gold dust, carnelian etc... In another inscription, he mentioned his victory over the territories of Magan, Meluhha, Elam and Amurru.

In the Gudea cylinders, Gudea mentions that "I will spread in the world respect for my Temple, under my name the whole universe will gather in it, and Magan and Meluhha will come down from their mountains to attend" (cylinder A, IX). In cylinder B, XIV, he mentions his procurement of "blocks of lapis lazuli and bright carnelian from Meluhha."

The first known reference to Goa in India possibly appears as Gubi in the records of Gudea. At the time, Sumerians had established trade contacts with India.

Later influence
Gudea's appearance is recognizable today because he had numerous statues or idols, depicting him with unprecedented, lifelike realism, placed in temples throughout Sumer. Gudea took advantage of artistic development because he evidently wanted posterity to know what he looked like. And in that he has succeeded. 

Gudea, following Sargon, was one of the first rulers to claim divinity for himself, or have it claimed for him after his death . Some of his exploits were later added to the Gilgamesh Epic (N. K. Sandars, 1972, The Epic of Gilgamesh).

Following Gudea, the influence of Lagaš declined, until it suffered a military defeat by Ur-Nammu, whose Third Dynasty of Ur then became the reigning power in Southern Mesopotamia.

Important artifacts

References

Sources

 
 
 
 F. Johansen, "Statues of Gudea, ancient and modern". Mesopotamia 6, 1978.
 A. Parrot, Tello, vingt campagnes des fouilles (1877-1933). (Paris 1948).
 N.K. Sandars, "Introduction" page 16, The Epic of Gilgamesh, Penguin, 1972.
 H. Steible, "Versuch einer Chronologie der Statuen des Gudea von Lagas". Mitteilungen der Deutschen Orient-Gesellschaft 126 (1994), 81–104.

External links

 The true face of Gudea. A realistic statue of Gudea shows us how he may have looked in real life.

22nd-century BC Sumerian kings
Kings of Lagash